Stavroula Constantinou (born 1975) is a Cypriot academic who specialises in Byzantine literature.

She was born in Dhekelia Cantonment, Sovereign Base Areas of Akrotiri and Dhekelia in 1975.  She studied Byzantine, Western Medieval and Modern Greek Literature at the University of Cyprus from 1992 to 1996, the Free University of Berlin from 1997 to 1999 and the University of Cambridge from 1999 to 2004.  Constantinou was also at the Free University of Berlin from 2000 to 2003 and was awarded a doctorate of philosophy degree in Byzantine Literature from that institution.

Constantinou has taught Byzantine philology at the University of Cyprus since 2004.  She was at the Free University once more for 2010-11 as an Alexander von Humboldt Foundation fellow.  Constantinou's fields of research include hagiography, Byzantine literary genres, poetry, performances and feminism and she has published 20 scholarly articles.  She has published two books: Female corporeal performances : reading the body in Byzantine passions and lives of holy women in 2005 and Court ceremonies and rituals of power in Byzantium and the medieval Mediterranean : comparative perspectives in 2013.  Constantinou is a member of the European Cultural Parliament.

References 

1975 births
Living people
21st-century historians
21st-century philologists
21st-century Cypriot women
21st-century women writers
Akrotiri and Dhekelia people
Alumni of the University of Cambridge
University of Cyprus alumni
Free University of Berlin alumni
Literary historians
Cypriot historians
Women literary historians
Academic staff of the University of Cyprus
Scholars of Byzantine literature